Accused is a 2014 Dutch drama film directed by Paula van der Oest and written by Moniek Kramer. It was selected as the Dutch entry for the Best Foreign Language Film at the 87th Academy Awards, making the January Shortlist.

Cast
Ariane Schluter as Lucia de Berk
Barry Atsma as Jaap van Hoensbroeck
Amanda Ooms as Jenny
Marwan Kenzari as Rechercheur Ron Leeflang
Fedja van Huêt as Quirijn Herzberg
Annet Malherbe as Ernestine Johansson
Sallie Harmsen as Judith Jansen

See also
List of submissions to the 87th Academy Awards for Best Foreign Language Film
List of Dutch submissions for the Academy Award for Best Foreign Language Film

References

External links

2014 films
2014 drama films
Dutch drama films
2010s Dutch-language films